Isaac Babadi (born 6 April 2005) is a Dutch professional footballer who plays for Jong PSV.

Club career 
Isaac Babadi made his professional debut for Jong PSV on the 10 January 2022, replacing Johan Bakayoko during a 5–1 home Eerste Divisie against Almere City, their largest win of the season at that point.

Personal life
Born in the Netherlands, Babadi is of Sierra Leonean descent.

References

External links

2005 births
Living people
Dutch footballers
Netherlands youth international footballers
Dutch people of Sierra Leonean descent
Association football midfielders
Jong PSV players
Eerste Divisie players